Lindsay is a city in Tulare County, California, United States. The population was 12,659 at the 2020 census. Lindsay is located southeast of Visalia and north of Porterville and is considered part of the Visalia-Porterville Metropolitan Area and the Porterville Urban Area by the United States Census Bureau.

History
The Yandanchei tribe of Native Americans came to hunt and fish at the future site of Lindsay for centuries. Future Military Governor of California John C. Frémont passed through twice by way of the Stockton - Los Angeles Road and the later Butterfield Overland Mail route on two of his four exploration trips. Julius Orton, a seventh generation descendant of Thomas, served as security for a pack train headed for Placerville, a booming California gold mining town, motivated by his futile search for gold. In the 1880s, Julius Orton homesteaded another piece of land bordering on the property of pioneers Lewis and John Keeley, brothers who had taken on a homestead just a few miles southwest of Lindsay in the mid-1870s.

In 1889, the founder of the City of Lindsay, Captain Arthur Hutchinson, moved to California because of his ill health. He moved to the Lindsay area and bought  to found the Lindsay Land Company.  When the Southern Pacific Railroad came through the area in 1889, development of the Lindsay townsite was begun.  Hutchinson laid out the plan for the township, and named the community for his wife, Sadie Lindsay Patton Hutchinson.

Geography
According to the United States Census Bureau, the city has a total area of 2.6 square miles (6.8 km), all of it land.

Climate
According to the Köppen Climate Classification system, Lindsay has a semi-arid climate(BSk) with hot, dry summers and cool, wet winters.

Demographics

2020

At the 2020 census, Lindsay had a population of 12,659. The racial makeup of Lindsay was Hispanic or Latino 88.4%, White 83%, Black or African American alone 0.4%, American Indian or Alaska Native 0.9%, Asian alone 0.6%, Native Hawaiian or Pacific Islander alone 0.0%, two or more races 13.7% and White alone, not Hispanic or Latino, 10.7%.

There were 161 veterans and 38.3% of residents were born outside of the United States.

The census reported 3,763 households, with 3.31 persons per household. 74.6% of households have a language other than English spoken at home.

There are 88% of homes with a computer in the household and 70.2% of households have a broadband internet subscription.

The median household income was $31,489 and 29.5% of people were living below the poverty line identified by the U.S. government.

2010

At the 2010 census Lindsay had a population of 11,768. The racial makeup of Lindsay was 6,480 (55.1%) White, 85 (0.7%) African American, 128 (1.1%) Native American, 267 (2.3%) Asian, 4 (0.0%) Pacific Islander, 4,367 (37.1%) from other races, and 437 (3.7%) from two or more races. Hispanic or Latino of any race were 10,056 persons (85.5%).

The census reported that 11,672 people (99.2% of the population) lived in households, no one lived in non-institutionalized group quarters and 96 (0.8%) were institutionalized.

There were 3,014 households, 1,890 (62.7%) had children under the age of 18 living in them, 1,719 (57.0%) were opposite-sex married couples living together, 578 (19.2%) had a female householder with no husband present, 233 (7.7%) had a male householder with no wife present.  There were 242 (8.0%) unmarried opposite-sex partnerships, and 19 (0.6%) same-sex married couples or partnerships. 401 households (13.3%) were one person and 210 (7.0%) had someone living alone who was 65 or older. The average household size was 3.87.  There were 2,530 families (83.9% of households); the average family size was 4.21.

The age distribution was 4,523 people (38.4%) under the age of 18, 1,439 people (12.2%) aged 18 to 24, 3,079 people (26.2%) aged 25 to 44, 1,848 people (15.7%) aged 45 to 64, and 879 people (7.5%) who were 65 or older.  The median age was 24.6 years. For every 100 females, there were 101.3 males.  For every 100 females age 18 and over, there were 96.8 males.

There were 3,193 housing units at an average density of 1,223.5 per square mile, of the occupied units 1,526 (50.6%) were owner-occupied and 1,488 (49.4%) were rented. The homeowner vacancy rate was 2.0%; the rental vacancy rate was 6.2%.  5,909 people (50.2% of the population) lived in owner-occupied housing units and 5,763 people (49.0%) lived in rental housing units.

2000
At the 2000 census there were 10,297 people in 2,717 households, including 2,208 families, in the city.  The population density was 1,649.7/km (4,264.4/mi2).  There were 2,865 housing units at an average density of 459.0/km (1,186.5/mi2).  The racial makeup of the city was 44.83% White, 0.57% African American, 1.51% Native American, 1.06% Asian, 0.15% Pacific Islander, 48.27% from other races, and 3.62% from two or more races. Hispanic or Latino of any race were 77.97%.

Of the 2,717 households 53.4% had children under the age of 18 living with them, 57.2% were married couples living together, 17.1% had a female householder with no husband present, and 18.7% were non-families. 15.9% of households were one person and 8.6% were one person aged 65 or older.  The average household size was 3.74 and the average family size was 4.16.

The age distribution was 38.0% under the age of 18, 11.4% from 18 to 24, 27.3% from 25 to 44, 14.2% from 45 to 64, and 9.1% 65 or older.  The median age was 25 years. For every 100 females, there were 102.6 males.  For every 100 females age 18 and over, there were 101.0 males.

The median income for a household in the city was $24,305, and the median family income was $24,934. Males had a median income of $23,645 versus $18,992 for females. The per capita income for the city was $8,230.  About 33.3% of families and 39.9% of the population were below the poverty line, including 49.3% of those under age 18 and 12.3% of those age 65 or over.

Economy
Lindsay's economy is primarily agricultural with an emphasis on citrus.

Arts and culture
Lindsay's Mural Tour

Government

Local government
Its mayor is Hipolito Angel Cerros (not elected, appointed in lieu 12/2020), Mayor Pro Tempore is Yolanda Flores (last elected 12/2022). The other city council members are Ramiro Serna (not elected, appointed in lieu 12/2020), Ramona Caudillo (not elected, appointed in lieu 12/2020), and Rosaena Sanchez (last elected 12/2022).

State and federal representation

In the United States House of Representatives, Lindsay is in

Sister cities 
  Ono, Japan

References

External links
Lindsay official website

Incorporated cities and towns in California
Cities in Tulare County, California
1910 establishments in California